On December 28, 2001, the National Assembly of the Republic of Azerbaijan adopted the Constitutional Law on the Commissioner for Human Rights (Ombudsman) of the Republic of Azerbaijan, and on March 5, 2002, the President signed a Decree on the application of this Law and, thus, creation and functioning of the legal framework.

History 
The Ombudsman of the Republic of Azerbaijan (Ombudsman) was elected by the National Assembly on July 2, 2002, with 111 votes (112 votes) out of three candidates nominated by the President of the Republic of Azerbaijan. Elmira Suleymanova has been the Ombudsman since her election. Three months after the election of the Commissioner on October 28, 2002, the Office of the Ombudsman initiated the reception and consideration of the applicants' complaints.

After the adoption of the Constitution of the Republic of Azerbaijan, the system of institutional mechanisms has been restructured in order to implement democratic, legal reforms in this field and to ensure effective human rights.

As a result of recent legal reforms, many international principles of human rights and freedoms have been reflected in the national legislation of Azerbaijan. The establishment of this institution has created new opportunities for eliminating deficiencies in the protection of human rights and freedoms, complementing the system of law-enforcement structures, eliminating existing barriers.

Establishment of the Human Rights Commissioner for the first time considering the provision of human rights in the Republic of Azerbaijan as a public duty is envisaged in the Decree of the President of the Republic of Azerbaijan "On Measures to Ensure Human and Civil Rights and Freedoms" of 22 February 1998. It is also planned to establish the Commissioner for Human Rights in the "State Program on Human Rights Protection", which was approved by the Presidential Decree of June 18, 1998.

Three months after the election of the Commissioner, on October 28, 2002, the Office of the Ombudsman initiated the examination of the applicants' complaints and complaints.

Not later than 2 months after the end of each year, the Commissioner submits an annual report on the protection of human rights in the country to the President of the country and reports to the National Assembly of the country.

International cooperation

Cooperation with the UN 
After World War II, national human rights institutions began to be established in many countries in order to effectively protect human rights at the national level.

On October 27, 2006, the Office of the Ombudsman of Azerbaijan was first accredited by the ICC Accreditation Subcommittee (SCA) "A" and registered as a national human rights institution in the UN system. In 2010, by analyzing the responses to the UN questionnaires addressed to the Office of the Ombudsman of the ILC, it was decided that the Constitutional Law on the Ombudsman, as well as the activities of the Commissioner for Human Rights in Azerbaijan, fully comply with the Paris Principles and was re-accredited with “A” status.

Cooperation with the Council of Europe 
After gaining independence, Azerbaijan became a full member of the Council of Europe (CoE) on January 25, 2001. Amending the Constitutional Law on the Ombudsman is an international obligation of Azerbaijan in order to effectively protect human rights and freedoms. The amendments made to the Constitutional Law on the Ombudsman are an international obligation of Azerbaijan in order to effectively protect human rights and freedoms.

The Commissioner for Human Rights and the staff of the Office of the Ombudsman of Azerbaijan will exchange views and practical experience by participating in the protection of human rights in various events organized by the CoE.

In addition, the Commissioner is a member of the European Network of National Preventive Mechanisms (NPM), established jointly by the Council of Europe Director General for Human Rights and Rule of Law and the Association for the Prevention of Torture (TLA). One member of the NPM team was appointed as the network coordinator.

International Ombudsman Institute (IOI) 
In December 2010, the Office of the Ombudsman of Azerbaijan became a member of the International Institute of Ombudsmen, with whom he has collaborated since 2003. The Commissioner regularly participates in events organized by the IOI and provides information to a wide audience about public policy and human rights developments in the country. As well as in numerous events initiated by the Commissioner, many leading representatives of the IOI participated and exchanged experiences in the relevant field.

European Ombudsman Institute 
The Commissioner has established close cooperation with the European Ombudsman Institute (EOI), which has been a member since 2003. The Office of the Ombudsman of Azerbaijan participates in the events of this organization and holds an exchange of practical experience in the field of human rights. Many of the EOI representatives were invited to participate in international conferences held by the Commissioner in Azerbaijan.

See also 
Commissioner for Human Rights

References 

Human rights
Human rights in Azerbaijan